Heaven Help The Fool is the second solo album by Grateful Dead rhythm guitarist Bob Weir, released in 1978. It was recorded during time off from touring, in the summer of 1977, while Grateful Dead drummer Mickey Hart recovered from injuries sustained in a vehicular accident. Weir returned to the studio with Keith Olsen, having recorded Terrapin Station with the producer earlier in the year. Several well-known studio musicians were hired for the project, including widely used session player Waddy Wachtel and Toto members David Paich and Mike Porcaro.

Only "Salt Lake City" and the title track were played live by the Grateful Dead, the former in its namesake location on February 21, 1995, and the latter in an instrumental arrangement during their 1980 acoustic sets. Despite this, Weir has continued to consistently play tracks from the album with other bands of his, including RatDog and Bobby Weir & Wolf Bros. "Bombs Away" was released as a single and peaked at number 70 on the Billboard Hot 100, becoming his only solo song to make the chart. The album itself stalled at number 69, one spot behind his previous album, Ace.

Track listing

Credits

Personnel
Bob Weir – rhythm guitar, vocals
Mike Baird – drums on tracks 1, 3-6 & 8
Bill Champlin – background vocals on tracks 1 & 3-8, keyboards on tracks 2 & 7, organ on tracks 3 & 8
David Foster – keyboards on tracks 1-8
Lynette Gloud – background vocals on tracks 5-8
Tom Kelly – background vocals on tracks 1-6 & 8
Dee Murray – bass guitar on track 2
Nigel Olsson – drums on tracks 2 & 7
David Paich – keyboards on tracks 1, 3-6 & 8
Mike Porcaro – bass guitar on tracks 1 & 3-8
Peggy Sandvig – keyboards on track 4
Tom Scott – saxophones on tracks 1, 3 & 5
Carmen Twilley – background vocals on tracks 5-8
Waddy Wachtel – lead guitar on tracks 2-3 & 7

Production
Producer – Keith Olsen
Engineers – David de Vore and Keith Olsen
Art direction – Ria Lewerke
Photography – Richard Avedon
Mastering – Ted Jensen at Sterling Sound, NYC

Charts

References

1978 albums
Bob Weir albums
Albums produced by Keith Olsen
Arista Records albums